Adi (Chikodi)  is a village in the southern state of Karnataka, India. It is located in the Chikodi taluk of Belgaum district in Karnataka. Its population is nearly 5000. It is located near Bangalore-Pune highway. Famous for Shri Mallikarjun (Gram Daivat)and Shri Dattatraya (Parmatmraj Maharaja) temple

See also
 Belgaum
 Districts of Karnataka

References

External links
 http://Belgaum.nic.in/

Villages in Belagavi district